The 1916 Ossory by-election was held on 28 April 1916.  The by-election was held due to the death of the incumbent Irish Parliamentary MP, William Delany.  It was won by the Irish Parliamentary candidate John Lalor Fitzpatrick.

References

1916 elections in Ireland
By-elections to the Parliament of the United Kingdom in Queen's County constituencies
1916 elections in the United Kingdom